Marjolijn Hof (born 1956) is a Dutch writer and lives in Amsterdam. She has won many awards including the "Gouden Uil Jeugd Literatuurprijs', the "Gouden Uil Prijs van de Jonge Lezer" and the "Gouden Griffel"..

In 2012 she received the Vlag en Wimpel award for her book Mijn opa en ik en het varken Oma with illustrations by Judith Ten Bosch. Ten Bosch also illustrated her book Een boek vol beesten - Neushoorn (2005).

Works in English translation
Against the Odds, Groundwood Books (2011) 
Mother Number One, Groundwood Books (2011)

References

External links 
 Official website

1956 births
Living people
Writers from Amsterdam
21st-century Dutch women writers
21st-century Dutch writers
Date of birth missing (living people)
Woutertje Pieterse Prize winners
Gouden Griffel winners